Saribia ochracea is a butterfly in the family Riodinidae. It is found in eastern Madagascar. The habitat consists of lowland forests.

References

Butterflies described in 1932
Nemeobiinae